Roxanne Potvin (born March 31, 1982 in Regina, Saskatchewan) is a bilingual French-English Canadian singer, guitarist and songwriter based in Gatineau, Quebec. Potvin has earned a Juno nomination, seven Maple Blues awards nominations, making appearances at the Montreal Jazz Festival and Ottawa Bluesfest, and has toured internationally,.

Early life
Born in Regina, where her father was a TV reporter for CBC, Potvin grew up in Hull, Quebec. From an early age, she was attracted to the 1950s American rock n' roll of Little Richard, Chuck Berry, Jerry Lee Lewis, Elvis Presley and the Everly Brothers. At the age of 13, she discovered the Beatles. On her 14th birthday, she received a guitar, and at 15, she discovered blues music and began experimenting with songwriting. She did not consider music as a career until two years later, when performing at open jams in Ottawa.

Career

Bogart's Bounce
Potvin made her recording debut in January 2002 when she sang an original tune on Bogart's Bounce, a Northern Blues release by Ottawa's JW-Jones Blues Band. Veteran blues giants Kim Wilson and Gene Taylor of the Fabulous Thunderbirds also appeared on the album.

Careless Loving
In 2003 Potvin wrote a canon of songs with which she self-produced, self-financed, self-released, and self promoted her first recording, Careless Loving. The album featured six original songs and four covers by Dinah Washington, Ruth Brown, Etta James and Buddy Johnson. This album helped build her reputation as a songwriter as well as a singer and player. Local writers (and campus and CBC Radio) embraced the CD, and Potvin's reputation began to spread.

The Way It Feels
The Way It Feels (2006), produced by Colin Linden, a Nashville-based Canadian guitarist and writer with 60 CD production projects to his name, helped bring together a cast of support players that included: Daniel Lanois, Bruce Cockburn, Wayne Jackson of The Memphis Horns, members of The Fairfield Four, and one of Potvin's favourite songwriters and singers, John Hiatt.

The album received a Juno Award nomination for Blues Album of the Year.

Time Bomb
Time Bomb (2007) featured three female blues players, Deborah Coleman, Sue Foley and Potvin. The title track, "Time Bomb", an instrumental where all three women take turns laying down leads. For the next nine songs the women spell each other off taking lead vocals and guitar duties of every third song until they come together again on the final track "In The Basement".

No Love for the Poisonous
No Love for the Poisonous (2008) was produced by Dave Mackinnon of FemBots. In a favourable review of the album, The Globe and Mail wrote, "Smartly timeless and featuring the most assured songwriting of Potvin's three-album career, No Love for the Poisonous is a wicked success story."

Play
In 2011, Potvin changed directions and recorded Play, an album with a combination of folk, indie rock and pop influences. She collaborated with Black Hen Music director and guitarist Steve Dawson and a crew of Vancouver studio musicians, recording an album of new songs in five days.

For Dreaming
Roxanne Potvin's latest album, For Dreaming, was released in 2016 and follows a five-year break from recording. Potvin stated that making For Dreaming largely on her own was "the most challenging and frightening experience" she has had in her career to this point but also "the most satisfying experience" as well, due to being able to work at home without any outside pressure.

Management
Roxanne Potvin signed with Alert Music Inc. late in 2005, and was managed by W. Tom Berry (Holly Cole, Kim Mitchell, Gino Vannelli) from 2005 to 2009. She is since self-managed.

Influences
Potvin has stated that her music has been influenced by her growing up and listening to artists such as: Dinah Washington, Freddie King, Muddy Waters, Big Bill Broonzy, John Hiatt, the Beatles, Elvis Presley, the Everly Brothers, Aretha Franklin, Sarah Vaughan, Billie Holiday, Solomon Burke, Irma Thomas, Jimmy Reed, the Staple Singers, Ruth Brown, and others. Contemporary or more recent influences include Beck, Bahamas, Kurt Vile, Brian Wilson.

Discography

Main releases

Collaborations

References

External links
Roxanne Potvin official website
Roxanne Potvin Facebook page
Roxanne Potvin Youtube channel
Roxanne Potvin Twitter

1982 births
Living people
Canadian blues guitarists
Canadian blues singers
Canadian women guitarists
Canadian women singer-songwriters
Fransaskois people
Musicians from Regina, Saskatchewan
Musicians from Gatineau
Writers from Regina, Saskatchewan
Writers from Gatineau
21st-century Canadian women singers
21st-century Canadian guitarists
21st-century women guitarists
Black Hen Music artists